Joseph Peter Breck (March 13, 1929 – February 6, 2012) was an American character actor. The rugged, dark-haired Breck played the gambler and gunfighter Doc Holliday on the ABC/Warner Bros. Television series Maverick as well as Victoria Barkley's (Barbara Stanwyck) hot-tempered middle son Nick in the 1960s ABC/Four Star Western, The Big Valley. Breck also had the starring role in an earlier NBC/Four Star Western television series entitled Black Saddle.

Early years
Joseph Peter Breck was born in Rochester, New York. He grew up living with his grandparents in Haverhill, Massachusetts, because they felt they could provide a more stable home environment than his father, who often traveled as a jazz musician. He attended the University of Houston, where he studied English and drama.

Family
Breck was the son of bandleader Joe Breck, who was nicknamed "The Prince of Pep", and whose band once included trombone player Jerry Colonna. His parents divorced when Peter was eight. Peter went with Joe, while his younger brother George accompanied their mother, resulting in a decades-long separation. In 1959 an Associated Press photograph showed the brothers reunited after being out of touch for 22 years. The caption explained: "George told newsmen he saw Peter on television and recognized a resemblance. He went to the actor's studio and the relationship was confirmed."

Career

Early career
After post-World War II United States Navy service in the 1940s on the aircraft carrier , Breck played professional basketball for the Rochester Royals during the 1948–49 season.  He then worked as a ranch hand while studying drama at the University of Houston, and went on to make his on-screen debut in a 1958 film that was eventually released under the title The Beatniks.

As well as performing in live theatre, Breck had several guest-starring roles on a number of popular series, such as Sea Hunt, several episodes of Wagon Train, Have Gun – Will Travel, Perry Mason and Gunsmoke (a disturbed cowboy in the 1963 title role “The Odyssey of Jubal Tanner”).

When Robert Mitchum saw Breck in George Bernard Shaw's play The Man of Destiny in Washington, D.C., he offered Breck a role as a rival driver in Thunder Road (1958). Mitchum helped Breck to relocate to Los Angeles, California. As Breck then did not have his own car, Mitchum lent him his Jaguar.  Mitchum introduced Breck to Dick Powell who contracted him to Four Star Productions where Breck appeared in the CBS western anthology series, Dick Powell's Zane Grey Theatre.

Breck appeared with fellow guest star Diane Brewster in the 1958 episode "The Lady Gambler" of the ABC western series, Tombstone Territory, starring Pat Conway and Richard Eastham. That same year, Breck appeared in an episode of the syndicated Highway Patrol, starring Broderick Crawford. He was also cast in an episode of NBC's The Restless Gun, starring John Payne. He appeared in a 1958 episode of "Gunsmoke" playing the role of murder suspect, Hoyt Fly, a cowboy working a Texas cattle drive. That same year, Breck played the role of bad guy in an episode of Wagon Train, "The Story of Tobias Jones", opposite Lou Costello.

From January 1959 to May 1960 Breck starred as Clay Culhane, the gunfighter-turned-lawyer in the ABC western Black Saddle, with secondary roles for Russell Johnson, Anna-Lisa, J. Pat O'Malley and Walter Burke. Unlike in The Big Valley, in which Breck played an easily angered rancher, he is low-key, restrained and considerate as the lawyer Culhane.

Breck was later a contract star with Warner Bros. Television,  where he appeared as Doc Holliday on Maverick, a part that had been played twice earlier in the series by Gerald Mohr and by Adam West on ABC's Lawman. Breck appeared in several other ABC/WB series of the time, such as Cheyenne, 77 Sunset Strip, The Roaring Twenties (as trumpet player Joe Peabody in the episode "Big Town Blues"), and The Gallant Men. He was cast as a young Theodore Roosevelt in the 1961 episode "The Yankee Tornado" of the ABC/WB Western series, Bronco, starring Ty Hardin. "The Yankee Tornado" features Will Hutchins of the ABC/WB Western series Sugarfoot in a crossover appearance.

Breck's first starring role in a film was Lad, A Dog (1962). The next year, he played the leading roles in both Samuel Fuller's Shock Corridor and the science fiction horror film The Crawling Hand. He also costarred in the cavalry movie, The Glory Guys. Between 1963 and 1965 Breck made three guest appearances on Perry Mason, including the roles of Clay Eliott in the 1963 episode "The case of the Bluffing Blast", defendant William Sherwood in the 1964 episode, "The Case of the Antic Angel", and defendant Peter Warren in the 1965 episode, "The Case of the Gambling Lady". During this time, he appeared on episodes of such television series as Mr. Novak, The Outer Limits, Bonanza and The Virginian.

Breck claimed to have been considered for leads on two successful television series produced by Quinn Martin The Fugitive (1963) and 12 O'Clock High (1964) with Breck commenting that "If you are a leading man in Hollywood you either draw $250,000 like Steve McQueen or you had better be in a series".

The Big Valley

From 1965 to 1969, Breck starred on The Big Valley as Nick Barkley, foreman of the Barkley ranch and son to Barbara Stanwyck's character, Victoria Barkley. The second of four children, Nick was hotheaded, short-tempered, and very fast with a gun. Always spoiling for a fight and frequently wearing leather gloves, Breck's character took the slightest offense to the Barkley name personally and quickly made his displeasure known, as often with his fists as with his vociferous shouts. Often this proved to be a mistake and only through the calming influence of his mother and cooler-headed siblings, Jarrod (Richard Long), half-brother Heath (Lee Majors), sister Audra (Linda Evans) and Eugene (Charles Briles; written out after season 1 when he was drafted into the Army), would a difficult situation be rectified. Having been a Barbara Stanwyck admirer since the 1940s, when he was a teenager, Breck developed an on- and off-screen chemistry with her, practicing longer lines and even being a ranch foreman on the set. After the series was canceled, he stayed close to her until her death.

After The Big Valley
In 1970 he appeared as Lafe Harkness on the TV western The Men From Shiloh (rebranded name for The Virginian) in the episode titled "Hannah." Most of his roles in the 1970s and 1980s were television guest-starring performances on such series as Alias Smith and Jones, Mission: Impossible, McMillan & Wife, S.W.A.T., The Six Million Dollar Man (again with Lee Majors), The Incredible Hulk and The Dukes of Hazzard, as well as roles as himself on Fantasy Island, and The Fall Guy which also starred former television "brother" Lee Majors.

In the mid-1980s, Breck moved to Vancouver, British Columbia, Canada, with his wife Diane and their son, Christopher. He was asked by a casting director to teach a weekly class to young actors on film technique. That once-a-week class became a full-time acting school - The Breck Academy - which he operated for 10 years. In 1990, Breck appeared in the Canadian cult film Terminal City Ricochet.

On January 20, 1990, while teaching at the drama school, Breck was notified of Barbara Stanwyck's death. She requested no funeral nor memorial.

In 1991, he appeared as Sham-Ir, the chief of all genies, in the NBC-TV movie special I Still Dream of Jeannie, the second reunion film which reunited I Dream of Jeannie TV series co-stars Barbara Eden and Bill Daily, along with Al Waxman and Ken Kercheval.

In the movie The Unnamable II: The Statement of Randolph Carter (1993), Breck played Sheriff Hatch.

In 1996, he appeared in an episode of the new version of The Outer Limits.

Breck provided the voice of Farmer Brown in "Critters", a 1998 episode of The New Batman Adventures.

His last television performance was on an episode of John Doe in 2002. Prior to his death, most of his film performances have been in undistributed films that are shown only at film festivals.

Personal life
Breck married dancer Diane Bourne in 1960. They had a son, Christopher, who died of leukemia at age 30.

Death
In June 2010 Breck's wife Diane announced on his website that the actor had been suffering from dementia and could no longer sign autographs for fans, although she said that he still read and enjoyed their letters. Despite this diagnosis, she said he was still physically healthy and did not require medication.

Thereafter, Diane Breck reported that her husband was  hospitalized on January 10, 2012. On February 6, 2012, Peter Breck died from his illness at the age of 82 in Vancouver, British Columbia.

Partial filmography

Thunder Road (1958) - Stacey Gouge (uncredited)
The Beatniks (1958, released in 1960) - Mooney 
I Want to Live! (1958) - Ben Miranda (uncredited)
The Restless Gun (1958) Episode "Take Me Home"
The Wild and the Innocent (1959) - Chip
Portrait of a Mobster (1961) - Frank Brennan
Lad, A Dog (1962) - Stephen Tremayne
Hootenanny Hoot (1963) - Ted Grover
The Crawling Hand (1963) - Steve Curan
Shock Corridor (1963) - Johnny Barrett
 The Virginian, episode "Rope of Lies" (1964) - Jess Carver 
The Glory Guys (1965) - Lt. Bunny Hodges
 A Man For Hanging (1972) - Avery Porter
Benji (1974) - Dr. Chapman
The Incredible Hulk (1980) - Hull
The Dukes of Hazzard (1981)- J.J. Sunday
The Sword and the Sorcerer (1982) - King Leonidas
Terminal City Ricochet (1990) - Ross Glimore
Highway 61 (1991) - Mr. Watson
The Unnamable II: The Statement of Randolph Carter (1992) - Sheriff Hatch
Decoy (1995) - Wellington
Lulu (1996)
Enemy Action (1999) - Gen. Turner
Jiminy Glick in Lalawood (2004) - Tibor

Notes

References

External links
 
 
 The Official Peter Breck website

1929 births
2012 deaths
American male film actors
American male stage actors
American male television actors
Male actors from Rochester, New York
Male Western (genre) film actors
Military personnel from Rochester, New York
University of Houston alumni
American expatriate male actors in Canada
Male actors from Vancouver
Male actors from Los Angeles
Deaths from dementia in Canada
United States Navy sailors
20th-century American male actors
Western (genre) television actors